Renée Victor (born June 15, 1953) is an American actress best known for her role as Lupita on Weeds, for providing the voice of female argonians in Bethesda Softworks' 2011 video game The Elder Scrolls V: Skyrim, and she also appeared in the 2014 film, Paranormal Activity: The Marked Ones.

Her previous work includes a recurring role in 2004 on ER, and a guest role on a 2010 episode of Childrens Hospital. In 2020-2021, she appeared in the TNT show Snowpiercer while working with actors such as Daveed Diggs.

She is also a choreographer and actress.

In 2017, Victor voiced Miguel's stern Abuelita Elena in the Disney-Pixar animated film Coco.

External links

1953 births
Living people
American choreographers
Place of birth missing (living people)
American voice actresses
American video game actresses
American television actresses
21st-century American women
Hispanic and Latino American actresses